"Death of Me" is the third single by Christian rock band Red from their second album, Innocence & Instinct. The single was released to Christian radio on December 18, 2008. The song was written by producer Rob Graves and then-guitarist Jasen Rauch.

Track listing

Charts

References

Red (American band) songs
2008 singles
Sony Music singles
Songs written by Rob Graves
Songs written by Jasen Rauch
2008 songs